Cobham is a surname. Notable people with the surname include:

 Sir Alan Cobham, aviation pioneer
 Alan Cobham (mathematician), the namesake of the Cobham's thesis in the computational complexity theory
 Anne Cobham (disambiguation), multiple people
 Billy Cobham (born 1944), jazz musician
 Catherine Cobham, British translator
 David Cobham, British film and television producer
 Eleanor Cobham, mistress and later wife of Humphrey, Duke of Gloucester, accused witch
 Eric Cobham, an early 18th-century pirate
 George Cobham (disambiguation), multiple people
 Henry Cobham (disambiguation), multiple people including:
 Henry de Cobham, 1st Baron Cobham (1260–1339), English peer
 John Cobham (disambiguation), multiple people
 Reginald de Cobham, 1st Baron Cobham (1295–1361), English knight and diplomat
 Thomas Cobham, multiple people
 Tilda Cobham-Hervey (b. 1994), Australian actress

See also
 James de Cobham, English medieval Canon law jurist and university chancellor

English-language surnames